Surya Institute or (SI) is an Indonesian-based organization specializing in educational development and training. Surya Institute was founded in 2006 by physicist Yohanes Surya. Surya Institute offices are located in the SURE Center, Summarecon Serpong, Tangerang, Banten, Indonesia. In 2014, Surya Institute manage three institutions: Surya College of Education Surya (STKIP Surya), Surya University and Surya Center for Learning Excellence (SCLE).

Activities and International Event 
Surya Institute often works with governments, local organizations, private companies and the international community to undertake research and development of teaching materials and teaching methods. It also routinely conducts teacher training events, seminars, road shows, TV shows, talk shows, and science camps.

In reaching their goal, they often partners with other organizations to run international educational events, such as:
  International Conference of Young Scientists or ICYS
 ASEAN Science Enterprise Challenge or ASEC in 2008, Jakarta
 Asian Science Camp, in 2008, Bali
 World Physics Olympiad or WoPhO in 2011, Mataram, Lombok
 Asia-Pacific Conference of Young Scientists or APCYS in 2012, Palangkaraya

In 2009, the foundation worked in Papua. They are looking for children of Papua, bringing them to the SURE Center, Summarecon Serpong, Tangerang, Banten, Indonesia and teach them physics & mathematics with GASING methods.

Referensi

Pranala Luar 
  Surya Institute official website
  Articles in yohanessurya.com

Educational organizations based in Indonesia
Organizations based in West Java